Bryan Save [Sah-vay] (born December 16, 1981) is a former American football defensive tackle. He was signed by the Indianapolis Colts as an undrafted free agent in 2004. He played college football at Colorado State.

Save was also a member of the San Francisco 49ers, Baltimore Ravens, Tampa Bay Buccaneers, Cologne Centurions, Denver Broncos, Philadelphia Soul, and Spokane Shock.

Professional career

Cologne Centurions
Save was selected by the Cologne Centurions in the fourth round of the 2006 NFL Europe Free Agent Draft.

Florida Tuskers
On June 7, 2010, Save requested a trade to the Florida Tuskers and was acquired from the Hartford Colonials in exchange for Keith Gray. This was the first documented trade in the UFL history.

References

External links
Arena Football League bio

1981 births
Living people
Sportspeople from Santa Ana, California
Players of American football from Honolulu
Players of American football from California
American football defensive tackles
American football offensive linemen
Colorado State Rams football players
Indianapolis Colts players
San Francisco 49ers players
Baltimore Ravens players
Tampa Bay Buccaneers players
Cologne Centurions (NFL Europe) players
Denver Broncos players
Philadelphia Soul players
New York Sentinels players
Florida Tuskers players